The Doveton Group of Schools is one of the oldest schools in Chennai. Today, the schools are under the Presidency of Mr. H. E. Wilkins.

It has six schools in its management which includes an elementary school, two higher secondary schools, a matriculation school, two ICSE, and ISC schools. 

The Doveton group of schools comprises the Doveton Girls' Higher Secondary School, the Doveton Boys' Higher Secondary School, The Doveton Oakley School for kindergarten education, The Doveton Boys' Higher Sec School (CISCE) and Doveton Girls' Hr.Sec.School (CISCE) are the best ICSE AND ISC School that offer the ICSE AND ISC Syllabus they are affiliated to the Council for the Indian Schools Certificate Examination The Doveton Group of Schools are rated as among the best schools in Chennai.

Captain John Doveton was the founder of the Doveton Group of Schools. He was an Anglo-Indian who played a significant role in the British campaigns of Afghanistan, Mysore and Central India and bequeathed 50,000 pounds for the purpose of education which led to the formation of the Doveton Corrie Schools and Doveton College in Calcutta (now Kolkata).

History 

On 1 March 1855, the Madras Parental Academic Institution and Doveton College were established at Vepery within the local limits of Madras and was opened for commencement of study. John Doveton was an Anglo Indian. Doveton is an illustrious name often mentioned in the history of the campaigns of Afghanistan, Mysore and Central India.

John was neglected by his relatives and grew up as an orphan, while in fact he belonged to an illustrious house. One of his uncles, while making enquiries after his own dead brother Michael (John’s father) found that his brother’s son (John Doveton) was a poor, friendless, orphan at a charity school in Madras. 

He succeeded in obtaining for his nephew a commission in the Army of the Nizam of Hyderabad.
John’s service dated from 21 March 1817. He rose to be Captain Commandant of the Seventh Regiment of Infantry, a rank next to that of a Brigadier.
John Doveton inherited a large fortune. He resigned his commission and went to live in London. He died on 15 October 1853. John Doveton took a great interest in the education of the community and bequeathed £ 50,000 in his will, for this purpose. This sum was equally divided between the Parental Academy at Calcutta, the name of which was then changed to Doveton college and another founded in Madras, the Doveton Protestant College.

Peter Carstairs was the Trustee and sole surviving executor of the Last Will and Testament of John Doveton. Peter Carstairs was based in Madras and was a merchant and an agent. He was Chairman of the first Appointed Trustees of the Madras Protestant College Trust. If it was not for this gentleman who actually carried out the wishes of John Doveton, these Doveton institutions would not have come into existence.
 
There have been several name changes such as the Madras Parental Academy and Doveton College to the Madras Doveton Institution and Protestant College, etc. It now goes under the name and style of the Doveton Protestant Schools Association, governed by the Madras Doveton Protestant college trust Deed, which embodies the Last Will and Testament of the late Captain John Doveton.

The Doveton Boys’ School was established in 1855, followed by the Doveton Girls’ School in 1856 and came into the present building in 1888. The Bishop Corrie High School, founded in 1836 amalgamated with Doveton Protestant College on 1 January 1928 bringing about another change to Doveton Corrie. A few years later Bishop Corrie started to function again at George Town but the name Corrie remained with Doveton. It was decided with effect from 1 January 2010 revert to the original name, by dropping Corrie from the name.

For several years right up to the year 1955 there were no additions for the Doveton Schools till the purchase of property at 8, General Collins Road by the Doveton Protestant Schools Association from Mr. Howard Oakley on 29 January 1955. The Board of Governors at that time purchased this property for educational purpose. 

On 15 July 1955 the Oakley Nursery School was established. On 1 April 2001, the name was changed to Doveton-Oakley. The President Management felt the necessity of starting another School to cater to children in and around Vepery area because of the increasing need for accommodation in our Schools. On 14 June 1993 the Doveton Matriculation School was started. The Management launched out on Rs.82 Lakh programme for the construction with all amenities for a separate building for the Matriculation School. 

The foundation tablet was laid by Dr. C. Palanivel, Director of School Education. The Matriculation School started in 1993. During the dynamic Presidency of Mr. H.E. Wilkins, the School has been upgraded to Higher Secondary level by July 1997 and the Nursery Section was introduced in June 2002. It is to be placed on record that the Management under the leadership of Mr. J.D. Bornshin had thought of celebrating the Founder’s Day from 1 March 1994. 

The Management at that function honored staff who have served in these institutions for over 25 years. On 9 June 2010, a New School Building was declared open by Mr. Neil O’Brien Chairman of the Council For the Indian School Certificate Examinations. 

This new addition to the Doveton Group under the Presidency of Mr. H.E. Wilkins, continues to offer the ISC stream of education. On 26 May 2011, The Doveton Sports Academy came into being, offering sports development opportunity to students in the neighbourhood. The Grace Matriculation Higher Secondary School in Kodungaiyur was acquired, by outright purchase, and taken over on 19 October 2011. 

The Management had decided to change the name to Doveton Matriculation Higher Secondary School, which shall be referred to as North Gate for convenience and brevity. The Founder’s Day Hymn, "Onward Christian Soldiers" was introduced with effect from 1 March 2011. 

The Chairman, Mr H.E. Wilkins, proposed that the Hymn "Bless This House" be adopted as our School Anthem with effect from 30 August 2012. He further explained that apart from the words and the meaningful composition are the sentiments attached to Hymn. It was recalled that the Late Lt. Col. C.T.O.A. 

Wright and Mrs. Phyllis Wright had bestowed their blessings on our Institution by prayerfully rendering this as Special Item during the Service of Thanksgiving held on 9 September 2010, to mark the commencement of a new building for the expansion of the ISC Schools. Lt. Col. C.T.O.A. Wright, during his lifetime, had always held our Institution in high esteem. 

He had rendered yeoman service to the Nation and the Community, in particular. this was his last public performance before he eventually died on 13 February 2012. He was 88 years old. Explaining this background, the Board accepted this proposal as a tribute to the Late Lt. Col. C.T.O.A. Wright.

References

Christian schools in Tamil Nadu
High schools and secondary schools in Chennai